Times Record News is a daily newspaper established in 1907 in Wichita Falls, Texas and owned by Gannett.

From 1976 until 1997, the Times Record News was part of Harte Hanks chain, when Scripps acquired the paper.

The Times Record News also publishes the Sheppard Senator, the local newspaper serving the military stationed in Wichita Falls at Sheppard Air Force Base, named for the late U.S. Senator Morris Sheppard of Texarkana.

References

External links

Wichita Falls, Texas
Wichita County, Texas
Gannett publications
Publications established in 1907
Daily newspapers published in Texas
1907 establishments in Texas